Joseph Webster (1885 – 15 October 1927) was an English professional footballer who made nearly 150 appearances in the Southern League for Watford as a goalkeeper. He later played in the Football League for West Ham United. After retiring from football, he became a trainer, serving Watford and Northampton Town.

Personal life 
Webster served in the 1st Football Battalion of the Middlesex Regiment during the First World War and saw action at the Somme, Third Ypres, Vimy Ridge and Cambrai. He died in 1927, following an appendix operation at Northampton General Hospital.

Career statistics

References

English footballers
English Football League players
Association football goalkeepers
Watford F.C. players
West Ham United F.C. players
Southern Football League players
1885 births
People from Ilkeston
Footballers from Derbyshire
Watford F.C. non-playing staff
Northampton Town F.C. non-playing staff
Midland Football League players
Southern Football League representative players
1927 deaths
Ilkeston United F.C. players
British Army personnel of World War I
Middlesex Regiment soldiers
Military personnel from Derbyshire